Silver Knight, (1967−1992) was a grey New Zealand Thoroughbred racehorse stallion. He was by Alcimedes (GB), his dam Cuban Fox was by Foxbridge. He was bred by Seton Otway at the Trelawney Stud, Cambridge, New Zealand. It was here that Polo Prince, Hi Jinx, Macdougal, Foxzami and Hiraji were bred before also going on to win their Melbourne Cups.

He was the winner of the 1971 Melbourne Cup ridden by Bruce Marsh trained by Eric Temperton. He also won the New Zealand St. Leger.

At stud he sired four stakes winners of six stakes wins. His son, Black Knight, went on to win the 1984 Melbourne Cup.

Namesake
Australian rail operator CFCL Australia named locomotive CF4402 after the horse.

See also

 Thoroughbred racing in New Zealand

Reference list

See also
 List of Melbourne Cup winners

Melbourne Cup winners
1967 racehorse births
1992 racehorse deaths
Racehorses bred in New Zealand
Racehorses trained in New Zealand
Sport in Cambridge, New Zealand
Thoroughbred family 2-r